Samuel Bai (born 27 October 1975) is a Papua New Guinean sprinter. He competed in the men's 4 × 400 metres relay at the 1996 Summer Olympics.

References

External links

1975 births
Living people
Athletes (track and field) at the 1996 Summer Olympics
Papua New Guinean male sprinters
Olympic athletes of Papua New Guinea
Place of birth missing (living people)